Volker Ullrich (born 14 October 1975) is a German politician of the Christian Social Union (CSU) who has been serving as a member of the Bundestag from the state of Bavaria since 2013.

Political career 
Ullrich first became a member of the Bundestag after the 2013 German federal election, elected in Augsburg City. In parliament, he has been a member of the Committee on Legal Affairs (since 2013) and the Committee on European Affairs (2018–2021). In this capacity, he serves as his parliamentary group's rapporteur on the fundamental rights in the German Constitution. Since the 2021 elections, Ullrich has been serving as his parliamentary group’s spokesperson for consumer protection.

In addition to his committee assignments, Ullrich is a member of the German Parliamentary Friendship Group with Portugal and Spain. Since 2014, he has been a member of the German delegation to the Parliamentary Assembly of the Council of Europe (PACE). In the Assembly, he has been chairing the Committee on the Election of Judges to the European Court of Human Rights since 2019. He is also a member of the Committee on Legal Affairs and Human Rights.

Other activities 
 Stiftung Forum Recht, Member of the Board of Trustees (since 2022)
 German Foundation for Consumer Protection (DSV), Member of the Board of Trustees (since 2022)
 Augsburg University of Applied Sciences, Member of the Board of Trustees

References

External links 

  
 Bundestag biography 

1975 births
Living people
Members of the Bundestag for Bavaria
Members of the Bundestag 2021–2025
Members of the Bundestag 2017–2021
Members of the Bundestag 2013–2017
People from Illertissen
Members of the Bundestag for the Christian Social Union in Bavaria
University of Augsburg alumni